is a Japanese company headquartered in Tokyo. It was established in 1964, and its main business is in lighting equipment.

History
Ushio, Inc., was established in 1964 from the electric lighting department of Ushio Industrial, Inc., which had grown in 1916 as Himeji Electric Bulb Company, out of a department of Chūgoku Gōdō Denki, owned jointly by the predecessor companies of Kansai Electric Power and Chūgoku Electric Power. Ushio moved its headquarters from Himeji, Hyōgo Prefecture, to Tokyo in 1971, while retaining its main research & development center in Himeji.

Ushio, Inc. is headed by its Chairman Jirō Ushio (牛尾治朗, 1931- ), who was the chairman of the influential Japan Association of Corporate Executives between 1995 and 1999, and was the president of Japan Productivity Center (日本生産性本部) between 2003 and 2014. Ushio Industrial, Inc., was named after his father, Kenji Ushio (牛尾健治, 1898-1958), a native of Himeji like his son.

Ushio was listed in the Second Section of Tokyo Stock Exchange in 1970, and in the First Section in 1980.

Ushio entered the European market in 1985, with the foundation of Ushio Europe B.V., which is located in Oude Meer, the Netherlands.

Business
Ushio's main business is in lighting equipment, from halogen lamps to more sophisticated digital lighting and video processing equipment. In 1992, Ushio bought the Christie group of companies in U.S, a company known for their digital cinema projectors.

Subsidiaries
 Ushio Lighting, Chuo-ku, Tokyo, Japan
 Xebex, Inc., Chuo-ku, Tokyo
 Maxray, Inc., Chiyoda-ku, Tokyo
 ADTEC Engineering, Chiyoda-ku, Tokyo
 Christie Digital Systems, Cypress, California, United States, and Kitchener, Ontario, Canada
 Christie Medical Holdings, Memphis, Tennessee, USA
 Ushio Europe B.V., Oude Meer, the Netherlands
 Ushio Germany GmbH, Steinhöring, Germany
 Ushio France S.A.R.L. Paris, France
 Ushio Poland Sp.z o.o. Błonie, Poland
 Ushio Korea Inc, Gangnam Daero Seocho-Gu, Seoul Korea

See also
Lighting equipment

References

External links
 Global Home of Ushio
 Ushio, Inc. (in Japanese)
 Ushio Korea Inc. (in Korean)
 Ushio America, Inc.
 Ushio Europe B.V.
 Ushio Europe B.V. (in German)

Electronics companies of Japan
Manufacturing companies based in Tokyo
Companies listed on the Tokyo Stock Exchange
Lighting brands
Electronics companies established in 1964
Japanese companies established in 1964
Japanese brands